Filhos do Carnaval (English: Sons of Carnival) is a Brazilian television series created by Cao Hamburger and Elena Soárez. Filmed in 2005 and aired in 2006, it eventually took a break after the actor who played the protagonist died. But later, it earned a new season, which aired in 2009.

Plot

Cast 
Jece Valadão ... Anésio Gebara
Felipe Camargo ... Anesinho
Enrique Diaz ... Claudinho
Rodrigo dos Santos ... Brown / Antônio Carlos
Thogun ... Nilo
Mariana Lima ... Ana Cristina
Tiago Queiroz Herz ... Cris
Jorge Coutinho ... Joel da Paixão
Felipe Martins ... Órfão / Zé Júlio
Felipe Wagner ... Sirio
Roberta Rodrigues ... Rosana
Maria Manoella ... Bárbara

Episodes 
Season 1

Gato, o bicho das sete vidas
Avestruz, o bicho que não quer ver
Vaca, o bicho que dá leite
Leão, o rei dos bichos
Abraço de urso
Elefante, o bicho que não esquece

Season 2

Arrivederci
Herança Paterna
Os Reis do Rio
Amigo Oculto
Vala Comum
Love Boat
O Legítimo

Awards

References

External links

Portuguese-language HBO original programming
HBO Latin America original programming
2000s Brazilian television series
2006 Brazilian television series debuts
2007 Brazilian television series endings
Brazilian crime television series
Brazilian drama television series